is a city located in Tochigi Prefecture, Japan. ,  the city had an estimated population of 94,926 in 36,795 households, and a population density of 190 persons per km².

Geography
Kanuma is located in central Tochigi Prefecture. The cities is located in the northern part of the Kanto region. The western half of the city area is occupied by the Ashio Mountains, and the eastern half by a diluvial plateau called Kanuma Plateau. The city is bordered by the prefectural capital of Utsunomiya to the east.

Surrounding municipalities
Tochigi Prefecture
 Utsunomiya
 Tochigi
 Sano
 Nikko
 Mibu
Gunma Prefecture
 Midori

Climate
Kanuma has a Humid subtropical climate (Köppen Cfa) characterized by warm summers and cold winters with heavy snowfall.

Demographics
Per Japanese census data, the population of Kanuma peaked around the year 2000 and has declined since.

History
Kanuma was the castle town for a 25,000 koku feudal domain in the early Edo period. Even after the domain was suppressed by the Tokugawa shogunate, the area continued to prosper from its location with a number of post stations on the Nikkō Reiheishi Kaidō. The town of Kanuma was created on April 1, 1889 with the establishment of then modern municipalities system. It was raised to city status on October 10, 1948. On January 1, 2006, the town of Awano (from Kamitsuga District) was merged into Kanuma.

Government
Kanuma has a mayor-council form of government with a directly elected mayor and a unicameral city legislature of 24 members. Kanuma contributes three members to the Tochigi Prefectural Assembly. In terms of national politics, the city is part of Tochigi 2nd district of the lower house of the Diet of Japan.

Economy
The economy of Kanuma is primarily agricultural. Hemp was once a major cash crop, but has been supplanted by soba and strawberries.

Education
Kanuma has 24 primary schools and ten middle schools operated by the city government. The city has four public high schools operated by the Tochigi Prefectural Board of Education.

Transportation

Railway
 JR East – Nikkō Line
 
 Tobu Railway – Tobu Nikkō Line
  -  -  -  -

Highway
  – Kanuma Interchange

Local attractions

External relations
 – Tieling, Liaoning, China
 – Grand Forks, North Dakota, USA

Noted people
Guts Ishimatsu, boxer
Hisashi Kurosaki, football player
Manabu Wakabayashi, football player
Sayaka Hirano, table tennis player
Takeji Nara,  Imperial Japanese Army general
Tosio Kato, mathematician
Michio Yuzawa, politician and cabinet minister

References

External links

Official Website 

Cities in Tochigi Prefecture
Kanuma, Tochigi